Muhammad 'Abid al-Sindi al-Ansari, was a Hanafi jurist (faqih), hadith expert (muhaddith), judge (qadi), and the shaykh of the 'ulama of his time in the city of Madina during the Ottoman Caliphate. His lineage reaches back to Abu Ayyub al-Ansari.

He has followed the Naqshbandi Sufi path. He was appointed qadi of Zabid. In 1232 A.H. he was appointed the leader of the scholars of Madina by the ruler of Egypt, Muhammad 'Ali Pasha. His grandfather migrated to Middle East and he was known as Shaykh al-Islam.

Name 
Muhammad 'Abid b. Ahmad 'Ali b. Muhammad Murad Ya'qub al-Hafiz b. Muhamud b. 'Abd al-Rahman, al-Sindi al-Ansari al-Khazraji al-Madani al-Hanafi al-Naqshbandi.

Life 
He was born in 1190 AH/1776 AD at Sehwan, a village in Sind on the bank of the Indus, north of Hyderabad. Educated at Zabid, he married a daughter of the then minister of San'a' and was appointed by the Imam of al-Yaman as his ambassador of Egypt. He then had a sojourn to his native land where after staying for a while, he left for al-Hijaz and was appointed by the Egyptian government as the chief of the 'Ulama' of al-Madina. He died at al-Madina, and was buried in al-Baqi' in Rabi' I (Rabi' al-Awwal), 1257 AH/April 1841 AD.

Books 
He has a number of works to his credit which include:
 Al-Mawahib al-Latifa 'ala Musnad al-Imam Abi Hanifa.
 Tawali' al-Anwar 'ala al-Durr al-Mukhtar, gloss by al-Sindi on al-Durr al-Mukhtar, which is a commentary by al-Haskafi (d. 1088/1677) on Tanwir al-Absar wa-Jami' al-Bihar by al-Timirtashi (d. 1004/1595).
 Sharh Taysir al-Wusul by Ibn Diba' al-Shaybani (d. 944/1537); he writes a commentary on over 1600 hadith.
 Sharh Bulugh al-Maram by Ibn Hajar al-'Asqalani.
 Tartib Musnad al-Imam al-Shafi'i.
 Al-Tawassul wa-Ahkamuh wa-Anwa'uh.

See also 
 Ahmad Zayni Dahlan
 Sulayman ibn 'Abd al-Wahhab
 List of Hanafis
 List of Sufis
 List of Muslim theologians
 List of Ash'aris and Maturidis

References 

1776 births
1841 deaths
Abu Ayyub al-Ansari
Hanafi fiqh scholars
Maturidis
Hadith scholars
19th-century Muslim theologians
Najjarite people
Indian people of Arab descent
Indian Sunni Muslim scholars of Islam
Indian Sufis
Sunni Sufis
Sunni imams
Sunni fiqh scholars
Sunni Muslim scholars of Islam
Shaykh al-Islāms
People from Sindh
Burials at Jannat al-Baqī